The Grand Théâtre, Lebanon also known as the Grand Théâtre des Mille et Une Nuits was a theatre located in downtown Beirut, Lebanon. The structure is currently unused.

Overview
It was designed by Youssef Aftimos and built in the 1920s by Jaques Tabet (a poet and theater lover). The building opened in 1929. The Grand Théâtre hosted throughout the years international performances and movie productions.

History
It was part of a commercial center that housed a hotel, rental apartments, offices and shops. The construction of the Grand Théâtre on the corner of Emir Bashir and Syria streets blocked the original 1878 design of a major thoroughfare connecting the harbor to the Pine Forest at the city's southern limit. The horseshoe-shaped auditorium of the theatre accommodated 630 seats with an orchestra, two balconies, and machinery for stage sets. A small electrically-operated steel dome slid on rails, allowing the roof to open for ventilation. A domed ceiling with decorated stained glass covered the lobby.

The Grand Théâtre opened in 1929 with a French musical called No, No, Nanette, adapted from a Broadway success. The theatre later hosted the Comédie Française, the Ballet des Champs-Elysées, the Egyptian Ramses Group, and concerts by Abdel Wahab and Um Kalthoum. The Grand Théâtre also screened international movie productions and catered for major literary and charity events. From the 1960s onwards, it operated solely as a movie theater. During the Lebanese civil war the building was used for various purposes (pornographic movies projection, field hospital). It was damaged and was progressively abandoned due to the heavy fighting in the area.

After the war the Grand Théâtre fell under the control of Solidere. The facade was restored and the building partially repaired. Solidere had plans to convert the building into a boutique hotel, but as of today the Grand Théâtre remains unused.

Timeline

 1920s: the Grand Théâtre is designed by Youssef Aftimus and built by Jacques Tabet
 1929: opening
 1960s: the Grand Théâtre is repurposed as a movie theater
 1975-1990: damaged by the civil war
 1994: ownership transferred to solidere. Restoration of the facade and partial repairs.
 2019: large numbers of Lebanese found an opportunity to rediscover the Grand Théâtre during the mass protests

See also
 Art Deco
 Beirut Central District
 Comedie Francaise
 Moorish Revival architecture
 Theatre of Lebanon
 Youssef Aftimos

References 

Sassine, Farès et Tuéni, Ghassan (direction) (2003) El-Bourj. Place de la Liberté et Porte du Levant, Editions Dar An-Nahar, Beyrouth.
http://blogbaladi.com/a-look-inside-le-grand-theatre-de-beirut/
Georges Arbid Collection, Arab Center for Architecture, Beirut.

External links  
 Grand Theatre: a Tale of Beirut (video documentary by Omar Naim)
 Le Grand Théâtre de Beyrouth in 15 Breathtaking Pictures

Buildings and structures in Beirut
Culture in Beirut
Tourist attractions in Beirut